Lucy Chet DeVito (born March 11, 1983) is an American actress. She is best known for her role as Stephanie in Melissa and Joey (2010–2012).

Early life
DeVito was born on March 11, 1983, in Los Angeles, the daughter of actors Danny DeVito and Rhea Perlman. She also has two younger siblings, a sister, Grace Fan DeVito, and a brother Jacob Daniel DeVito. Her father is Catholic and her mother is Jewish.

She graduated from Brown University in 2007 with a degree in theater.

Career
In 2008, DeVito starred as Anne Frank in a production of Anne Frank at the Intiman Theatre in Seattle, Washington.

In 2009, she starred as La Piccola in the play The Miracle at Naples at the Huntington Theatre.

Her first major movie role was the 2009 film Leaves of Grass; later that year DeVito starred alongside her mother in the off-Broadway play Love, Loss, and What I Wore,  adapted by Nora and Delia Ephron, at the Westside Theatre.

She portrayed the daughter of Danny DeVito's character in the 2016 film The Comedian.

In 2016, DeVito performed the role of Annelle Dupuy-Desoto in Steel Magnolias at the Bucks County Playhouse in New Hope, Pennsylvania. This production was directed by Marsha Mason, and also starred Patricia Richardson, Elaine Hendrix, Jessica Walter and Susan Sullivan.
On June 9, 2016, this production became the highest-grossing show in the history of the Bucks County Playhouse.

In 2017, she portrayed Elanor in the play Hot Mess, a romantic comedy.

Filmography

Film

Television
Crumbs (2006), as Cashier
It's Always Sunny in Philadelphia (2006–2007), as Jenny/Woman
Dirt (2007), as Linda
Melissa & Joey (2010–2012), as Stephanie Krause
Alpha House (2014), as Charity Robeson
Girls (2015), as Lisa
DeadBeat (2014–2016), as Sue
The Marvelous Mrs. Maisel (2018–2019), as Irene
Shameless (2019), as a hospital admissions employee
Little Demon (2022–present), as Chrissy Feinberg

Theater
Anne Frank (2008), as Anne Frank
The Miracle at Naples (2009), as La Piccola
Love, Loss, and What I Wore (2009), as one of the 5 women

References

External links

1983 births
Living people
21st-century American actresses
Actresses from Los Angeles
Actresses from New York City
American film actresses
American people of Italian descent
American people of Polish-Jewish descent
American people of Russian-Jewish descent
American television actresses
Brown University alumni
Jewish American actresses
21st-century American Jews